Mount Bintuod or Mount Dalimanoc is a mountain in the Sierra Madre range in the municipality of Alfonso Castañeda in Nueva Vizcaya province. There are no records of the first ascent, but local tribe people have long established paths.

In some maps this peak is misidentified as Mount Dalimonoc, an actually lower peak adjoining Bintuod to the west.

The forested peak can be reached in a two days one night return hike from Barangay Lipuga, Alfonso Castañeda, Nueva Vizcaya. This rural area of the Philippines is traditional land of the Bugkalot or Ilongot tribe and was only opened to a road via Carranglan, Nueva Ecija in 1997 when a hydropower dam was constructed in the Casignan River of the same valley.

See also
 List of mountains in the Philippines
 List of Southeast Asian mountains

References

Mountains of the Philippines
Sierra Madre (Philippines)
Landforms of Nueva Vizcaya